Kelvin Amian Adou (born 8 February 1998) is a French professional footballer who plays as a right back for Serie A club Spezia.

Club career

Toulouse
Amian is a youth exponent from Toulouse FC. He made his Ligue 1 debut on 14 August 2016 against Marseille playing the full game.

Spezia
On 23 July 2021, Amian signed with Serie A club Spezia on a five year deal.

Personal life
Amian is of Ivorian descent.

Career statistics

Club

References

External links
France profile at FFF
Toulouse profile

Living people
1998 births
Association football defenders
French footballers
France under-21 international footballers
France youth international footballers
French sportspeople of Ivorian descent
Ligue 1 players
Ligue 2 players
Serie A players
Toulouse FC players
Spezia Calcio players
French expatriate footballers
French expatriate sportspeople  in Italy
Expatriate footballers in Italy